Local elections took place in some parts of the UK on 7 June 2001.  Elections took place for all of the English shire counties, some English unitary authorities and all of the Northern Ireland districts.  The elections were delayed from the usual date of the first Thursday in May due to the 2001 foot and mouth crisis and were held on the same day as the general election.

While the results were overshadowed by the re-election of the Labour government, they did provide some comfort to the Conservative party.  The Conservatives consolidated their position as the largest party on the English county councils.

Summary of results

The results of the English local elections saw the Conservative party make significant progress, gaining control of a further five councils.  The Labour party lost control of Cumbria and Warwickshire county councils, while the Liberal Democrats suffered losses of both of their councils and councillors.

The results in a number of these councils were mostly in line with the general election results.

The Conservatives gain of Cheshire county council coincided with their gain of the Tatton constituency, while their gain of Norfolk county council coincided with a gain in North West Norfolk and a big swing to them in South West Norfolk (although there was a Lib Dem gain in North Norfolk but only on a small swing). The Lib Dem loss of Somerset coincided with them narrowly losing Taunton to the Conservatives, and falling back in key target seats such as Wells and Bridgwater, which fall under the county council's area.

Some bucked trends, however. Labour lost Cumbria despite holding up relatively well in their four parliamentary seats in the county, though the Conservative majority was eroded by the Lib Dems in Westmorland and Lonsdale, which the Lib Dems eventually won in 2005 and have held ever since. Warwickshire was lost by Labour, which was admittedly on a knife-edge, though this was despite swings in their favour in key Conservative targets such as Rugby & Kenilworth and Warwick & Leamington.

The Conservatives gained Dorset. Despite the fact in 1997 when they won every constituency in Dorset (some by small margins admittedly), the council remained in no overall control. Whereas this time when they gained control of it, they lost two parliamentary seats: Dorset South to Labour and Mid-Dorset & Poole North to the Lib Dems by small margins. Despite those gains and some swings to the Lib Dems in other seats in Dorset, there was a big swing to the Conservatives in Christchurch.

The Lib Dem loss of Devon county council coincided with the Lib Dems actually gaining Teignbridge from the Conservatives and significantly increasing their majority in Torbay, a key Conservative target. There were smaller swings away in the Conservatives' favour in their marginal seats such as Tiverton & Honiton and Totnes, and they achieved a small swing in one of their targets, Devon West & Torridge.

England

Non-metropolitan county councils
In all 34 English county councils the whole council was up for election.

‡ New ward boundaries

Unitary authorities
In two English unitary authorities the whole council was up for election while a further nine unitary authorities had one third of the council up for election.

Whole council

‡ New ward boundaries

Third of council

Sui generis

Northern Ireland

In all 26 Northern Ireland districts the whole council was up for election.  They were elected by Single transferable vote.  They saw the Democratic Unionist Party and Sinn Féin make gains at the expense of the other parties.

References

External links
Vote 2001 BBC News
The local elections of 7 June 2001. House of Commons Library Research Paper 01/71.
Northern Ireland local election results

 
2001
Local elections
June 2001 events in the United Kingdom